Nina Kirsanova (1898 – 3 February 1989) was one of the most important ballet artists in Belgrade, who distinguished herself as a lead principal dancer, choreographer, head of ballet and ballet teacher. She also spent time as a nurse, archaeologist and actress.

Early life
Nina Vasilievna Kirsanova was born in Moscow in 1898, to Vasil and Zinaida Vaner. The name "Kirsanova" was used as a stage name. She started her ballet education rather late, at the age of 13, due to her father's disapproval. In 1919 she finished her education in Moscow and the same year married Boris Popov, an opera soloist at The Bolshoi Theatre. Under his influence, she applied for and passed an audition at The Bolshoi Theatre. She never had a chance to perform on the stage of the famous theatre since she fled with her husband to Poland in 1920, and then from there to Serbia in 1923.

Career
Upon her arrival in Belgrade her talent didn't go unnoticed, and soon she became a member of The Manjež Theatre, and then the National Theatre in Belgrade, where she gave her best performances in ballets "Giselle", "Coppelia" and "Madame Butterfly". Although Belgrade audience adored her, the temptation to go to France was too strong, so she went to Paris in 1926, to one of the best ballet schools in the world.

After joining the company of the famous Anna Pavlova, she got the confirmation of her great talent. She performed as a principal dancer in all the continents (1927–1931). In 1931 Anna Pavlova died, and the company was dismissed. Although she performed all over the world, her love for Belgrade brought her back to Serbia where she became a head of ballet, choreographer and director at The National Theatre in Belgrade. Under her leadership The National Theatre ballet had its first performance abroad, in Athens. During that period she did 28 ballet and opera choreographies, and 18 roles as a lead principal dancer. Further more, once again she decided to pursue her international career. From 1934 until 1937 she worked in Monte Carlo Opera, as a head of ballet, choreographer and lead principal dancer. After that she spent one year at The Lithuanian Opera.

The Second World War
When World War II started she decided to return to her one and only home - Belgrade. She settled down in Dorćol, where she opened her own ballet studio and commenced very successful career as a ballet teacher. During the war years she managed to keep the ballet ensemble in session, although the building of The National Theatre was heavily damaged in bombing attacks in 1941. Upon Red Army's arrival in Belgrade many Russian ballet dancers left the city for fear or reprisal. Immediately after the bombing in 1945, Nina Kirsanova volunteered as a nurse, looking after the wounded and assisting in the operation rooms. Growing up next to her mother, who was a doctor, she knew a lot about medicine.

End of career and a new beginning
After the war, she founded the ballet studio at The National Theatre in Belgrade, which became, together with the ballet department at The Music Academy, The National Ballet School. Her ballet engagement at The National Theatre ended on 18 December 1951 with the farewell performance of the "Swan Lake" with her as a director and choreographer. On that evening she celebrated 35 years of work and appeared as a principal dancer for the last time.
After retiring she continued with the ballet, but she also found the time to fulfil an old desire and enrolled and finished Archeology at Belgrade University. At the age of 70 she got a master's degree, and then travelled on the scientific expeditions around the Middle East. As if all of that wasn't enough, she tried herself as an actress at the age of 85, and appeared in Srđan Karanović's movie "Something in Between". Last years of her life she spent, living very modestly in a bedsit, at Čubura. She died in 1989, at the age of 91, and was buried in the Alley of Distinguished Citizens at New Cemetery.
The City of Belgrade named a street after her. There is also an exhibition in her honour at The Museum of Theatrical Arts of Serbia.

References

External links

Nina Kirsanova - primabalerina i arheolog
Nina Kirsanova plesala sa Pavlovom
Baletske patike, pijanino i mačak Vasilije

1898 births
1989 deaths
Female wartime nurses
Ballerinas from the Russian Empire
Dancers from Moscow
20th-century ballet dancers
University of Belgrade alumni
People from Belgrade
Ballet choreographers
Ballet teachers
Women in World War II
Soviet emigrants to Yugoslavia